MIPIM (in French, Le Marché International des Professionnels de L’immobilier) is an international property event hosted in Cannes, France, each March. It is hosted by Reed MIDEM and includes an exhibition area, networking events and conference sessions over four days. The 2022 event is due to take place from March 15 to 18.

The event aims to facilitate business between investors, corporate end-users, local authorities, hospitality professionals, industrial and logistics players and other real estate professionals.

Program 
MIPIM presents discussions, keynotes, panels and presentations focusing on property investment, trends and development across many real estate sectors.

MIPIM offers several networking events, with the goal of facilitating business between participants. These events usually include themed breakfasts and luncheons, an opening cocktail party, the MIPIM Awards ceremony, and dedicated meetings.

"RE-Invest (the Real Estate Institutional Investors' Summit) serves as a platform to discuss real estate issues. Prior to the event, research and surveys are commissioned by MIPIM to determine important industry questions. During the event, participants review and debate the findings of this research. An analysis of the summit is then published and circulated.

In 2022, MIPIM took place from March 15 to March 18 and was partially devoted to the Ukrainian companies (such as UDP, Altis, Intergal-bud) in order to support them in their struggle with Russian invasion of Ukraine.

Country of Honour 
Each year, MIPIM highlights a country which shows great development and achievement in the real estate industry. The country is named "Country of Honour" and a series of conferences and events are held about it. Germany was named Country of Honour in 2012, Turkey was named as the 2013 Country of Honour, and in 2014, Brazil, Russia and Turkey were recognised as Countries of Honour.

MIPIM Awards 
The MIPIM jury and delegates vote to determine the winners of the MIPIM Awards in several categories.

Past MIPIM Awards winners 

The People's Choice Award was started in 2012, and includes an online vote by participants on the official MIPIM Facebook page.

2012 MIPIM Awards winners 
 Best Hotel & Tourism Resort: Six Senses Con Dao, Bà Rịa, Vietnam
 Best Industrial & Logistics Development: McLaren Production Centre, Woking, United Kingdom
 Best Office and Business Development: Main Point Karlin, Prague, Czech Republic
 Best Refurbished Building: "The Library" - New Community Center and Library, Copenhagen, Denmark
 Best Residential Development: 'Residence le 19' in the Claude Bernard area in Paris, Paris, France
 Best Shopping Centre: Morocco Mall, Casablanca, Morocco
 Best Futura Project: Police station  - Charleroi/Danses Performing Arts Center, Charleroi, Belgium
 Best Futura Mega Project: Express Rail Link West Kowloon Terminus, Hong Kong
 Best German Project: Maintor- The Riverside Financial District, Frankfurt am Main, Germany
 Special Jury Award: Refurbishment , Hamburg, Germany
 People's Choice Award: D-Cube City, Seoul, South Korea

2013 MIPIM Awards winners 

There were 12 nominations in 2013. The list of winners:

 Best Hotel & Tourism Resort: Baku Flame Towers (Baku, Azerbaijan)
 Best Industrial & Logistics Development: Wastewater Treatment Plant in North Alt Maresme (Pineda de Mar)
 Best Office and Business Development: The Squaire (Frankfurt am Main, Germany)
 Best Refurbished Building: King's Cross (London, United Kingdom)
 Best Residential Development: Isbjerget / The Iceberg (Aarhus, Denmark)
 Best Shopping Centre: Marmara Park (Istanbul, Turkey)
 Best Futura Project: Culture Casbah (Malmö, Sweden)
 Best Futura Mega Project: Milaneo (Stuttgart, Germany)
 Best Turkish Project: Bosphorus City (Istanbul, Turkey)
 People's Choice Award: Akasya Acibadem Lake & Woods Parcels (Istanbul, Turkey)
 Special Jury Award: King's Cross (London, United Kingdom)
Most adorable QS: JDG

2015 MIPIM Awards winners 
 Best Hotel & Tourism Resort: Center Parcs Woburn Forest
 Best Industrial & Logistics Development: Würth Svenska AB
 Best Innovative Green Building: One Central Park, Sydney, Australia
 Best Office & Business Development: Selcuk Ecza HQ
 Best Refurbished Building: Dreischeibenhaus, Düsseldorf, Germany
 Best Residential Development: Krøyers Plads I
 Best Shopping Centre: Markthal Rotterdam
 Best Urban Regeneration Project: Boulevard Euromediterranée – Marseille's new waterfront
 Best Futura Project: 
 Best Futura Mega Project: New North Zealand Hospital
 People's Choice Award: Oxygen Eco-tower
 Special Jury Award: Queen Elizabeth Olympic Park

2016 MIPIM Awards winners 
 Best Healthcare Development: Queen Elizabeth University Hospital & Royal Hospital for Children (Glasgow, United Kingdom)
 Best Hotel & Tourism Resort: JW Marriott Venice Resort & Spa (Venice, Italy)
 Best Industrial & Logistics Development: ELI Beamlines (Prague, Czech Republic)
 Best Innovative Green Building: Treurenberg (Brussels, Belgium)
 Best Office & Business Development: #CLOUD.PARIS (Paris, France)
 Best Refurbished Building: Papillon (Düsseldorf, Germany)
 Best Residential Development: Katscha (Norrköping, Sweden)
 Best Shopping Centre: Les Docks Village (Marseille, France)
 Best Urban Regeneration Project: Crossrail Place (London, United Kingdom)
 Best Futura Project: Paradis Express (Liège, Belgium)
 Best Futura Mega Project: DUO PARIS – Taking urban sensations to new heights (Paris, France)
 People's Choice Award: Shanghai Tower (Shanghai, China)

2017 MIPIM Awards winners 
 Best Healthcare Development: GAPS – New psychiatric hospital (Slagelse, Denmark)
 Best Hotel & Tourism Resort: Maison Albar Hotel Paris Céline (Paris, France)
 Best Industrial & Logistics Development: Nike European Logistics Campus (Ham, Belgium)
 Best Innovative Green Building: The Museu do Amanhã (Museum of Tomorrow) (Rio de Janeiro, Brazil)
 Best Office & Business Development: Warsaw Spire (Warsaw, Poland)
 Best Refurbished Building: Chambon (Brussels, Belgium)
 Best Residential Development: li01 - New construction of six apartment buildings, Liebigstrasse 1 (Berlin, Germany)
 Best Shopping Centre: Victoria Gate (Leeds, United Kingdom)
 Best Urban Regeneration Project: be-MINE (Beringen, Belgium)
 Best Futura Project: China World Trade Center Phase 3C Development (Beijing, China)
 Best Futura Mega Project: Kashiwa-no-ha Smart City (Kashiwa City, Chiba, Japan)
 Special Jury Award: Beyazıt State Library (Istanbul, Turkey)

2018 MIPIM Awards winners 
 Best Futura Mega Project: Mui Dinh Ecopark (Mui Dinh, Vietnam)
 Best Futura Project: National Museum of Qatar (Doha, Qatar)
 Best Healthcare Development: The Maersk Tower (Copenaghen, Denmark)
 Best Hotel & Tourism Resort: Catholic-Social Institute (Siegburg, Germany)
 Best Industrial & Logistic Development: The Chapelle International logistics centre (Paris, France)
 Best Innovative Green Building: Marina One, Singapore (Singapore)
 Best Office & Business Development: Feltrinelli Porta Volta (Milan, Italy)
 Best Refurbished Building: Antwerp Port House (Antwerp, Belgium)
 Best Residential Development: Îlot Sacré (Brussels, Belgium)
 Best Shopping Centre: Fico Eataly World (Bologna, Italy)
 Best Urban Regeneration Project: Porta Nuova (Milan, Italy)
Best Futura Mega-Project: Mui-Dinh Ecopark (Mui-Dinh, Vietnam)

2019 MIPIM Awards winners 
 BEST HEALTHCARE DEVELOPMENT: Polyclinique Reims-Bezannes (Bezannes, France)
 BEST HOTEL & TOURISM RESORT: Club Med Cefalù (Cefalù, Italy)
 BEST INDUSTRIAL & LOGISTICS DEVELOPMENT: Greenwich Peninsula Low Carbon Energy Centre (London, United Kingdom)
 BEST MIXED-USE DEVELOPMENT: The Student Hotel Florence Lavagnini (Florence, Italy)
 BEST OFFICE & BUSINESS DEVELOPMENT: Laborde (Paris, France)
 BEST REFURBISHED BUILDING: KOSMO (Neuilly-sur-Seine, France)
 BEST RESIDENTIAL DEVELOPMENT: WOODIE Hamburg (Hamburg, Germany)
 BEST SHOPPING CENTRE: HIRAKATA T-SITE (Hirakata, Japan)
 BEST URBAN REGENERATION PROJECT: Rebuilding Frankfurt's old centre (Frankfurt am Main, Germany)
 BEST FUTURA PROJECT: Mille Arbres (Paris, France)
 BEST FUTURA MEGA PROJECT: Future Park (Yorkshire, United Kingdom)
 SPECIAL JURY AWARD: « Zaryadye » park with a multifunctional concert complex (Moscow, Russia)

MIPIM UK
MIPIM UK was held for the first time in October 2014 at Olympia, London. 4,000 participants and 575 investors from 35 cities attended.

There were protests outside the venue on the first day against links between British local authorities and property developers. Police held back demonstrators and the gates were closed by the organisers. One delegate was arrested on suspicion of assault.

The 2015 event was held from October 21 to 23.

The 2016 event took place from 19 – 21 October, and focused on the UK property industry.

References

External links

Real estate in France
Trade fairs in France
Cannes